Hamsij (also Romanized as Hamsīj; also known as Ham Sheykh and Hamsīch) is a village in Siriz Rural District, Yazdanabad District, Zarand County, Kerman Province, Iran. At the 2006 census, its population was 57, in 14 families.

References 

Populated places in Zarand County